In mathematics, Vieta's formulas relate the coefficients of a polynomial to sums and products of its roots. They are named after François Viète (more commonly referred to by the Latinised form of his name, "Franciscus Vieta").

Basic formulas
Any general polynomial of degree n

(with the coefficients being real or complex numbers and ) has  (not necessarily distinct) complex roots  by the fundamental theorem of algebra. Vieta's formulas relate the polynomial's coefficients to signed sums of products of the roots  as follows:

Vieta's formulas can equivalently be written as 

The left-hand sides of Vieta's formulas are the elementary symmetric polynomials of the roots.

Vieta's system  can be solved by Newton's method through an explicit simple iterative formula, the Durand-Kerner method.

Generalization to rings
Vieta's formulas are frequently used with polynomials with coefficients in any integral domain . Typically,  is the ring of the integers, the field of fractions is the field of the rational numbers and the algebraically closed field is the field of the complex numbers.

Vieta's formulas are then useful because they provide relations between the roots without having to compute them.

For example, in the ring of the integers modulo 8, the quadratic polynomial  has four roots: 1, 3, 5, and 7.

Example
Vieta's formulas applied to quadratic and cubic polynomials:

The roots  of the quadratic polynomial  satisfy

The roots  of the cubic polynomial  satisfy

Proof
Vieta's formulas can be proved by expanding the equality

(which is true since  are all the roots of this  polynomial), multiplying the factors on the right-hand side, and identifying the coefficients of each power of 

Formally, if one expands  the terms are precisely  where  is either 0 or 1, accordingly as whether  is included in the product or not, and k is the number of  that are included, so the total number of factors in the product is n (counting  with multiplicity k) – as there are n binary choices (include  or x), there are  terms – geometrically, these can be understood as the vertices of a hypercube. Grouping these terms by degree yields the elementary symmetric polynomials in  – for xk, all distinct k-fold products of 

As an example, consider the quadratic

History 
As reflected in the name, the formulas were discovered by the 16th-century French mathematician François Viète, for the case of positive roots.

In the opinion of the 18th-century British mathematician Charles Hutton, as quoted by Funkhouser, the general principle (not restricted to positive real roots) was first understood by the 17th-century French mathematician Albert Girard: 
...[Girard was] the first person who understood the general doctrine of the formation of the coefficients of the powers from the sum of the roots and their products. He was the first who discovered the rules for summing the powers of the roots of any equation.

See also

 Content (algebra)
 Descartes' rule of signs
 Newton's identities
 Gauss–Lucas theorem
 Properties of polynomial roots
 Rational root theorem
 Symmetric polynomial and  elementary symmetric polynomial

References 

 
 

Articles containing proofs
Polynomials
Elementary algebra